The  is a traditional Japanese string instrument, the only one played with a bow. A variant of the instrument also exists in Okinawa, called  in Okinawan.

It has three (or, more rarely, four) strings and is played upright, with a horsehair-strung bow bowing the strings. It is often tuned the same as a  but an octave higher.

A  society, dedicated to promoting the instrument, exists in Japan.

The  has also been used in jazz and blues, with the American multi-instrumentalist Eric Golub pioneering the instrument's use in these non-traditional contexts. One of the few non-Japanese performers of the instrument, he has recorded as a soloist as well as with the cross-cultural jazz band of John Kaizan Neptune.

In Japanese, the term  may refer broadly to any bowed string instrument of Asian origin, as does the Chinese term .

See also

References

External links
Co-Q.com (Japanese)

Listening
Kokyu audio (click small white stars to listen to individual tracks)

Bowed instruments
Drumhead lutes
Japanese musical instruments
Japanese words and phrases